Gemmulopsis is an extinct genus of sea snails, marine gastropod mollusks in the family Turridae.

Species
Species within the genus Gemmulopsis include:
 † Gemmulopsis nigellensis Tracey & Craig, 2019

References

 Tracey S., Craig B. & Gain O. (2019). Turridae (Gastropoda, Conoidea) from the late Lutetian Eocene of the Cotentin, NW France: endemism through loss of planktotrophy?. Carnets de Voyages Paléontologiques dans le Bassin Anglo-Parisien. 5: 101–140.

Turridae